Riitta Karjalainen (born 26 May 1968) is a Finnish orienteering and ski-orienteering competitor. 

She won a silver medal in the relay at the 1992 World Ski Orienteering Championships in France, together with Mirja Ojanen and Virpi Juutilainen. She finished second overall in the World Cup in Ski Orienteering in 1993.

References

1968 births
Living people
Finnish orienteers
Female orienteers
Foot orienteers
Ski-orienteers